Zorgey Ritoma is a village situated in Gannan Tibetan Autonomous Prefecture, Gansu province, China.
The population of around 1,500 is ethnically Tibetan. Most of the inhabitants raise cattle for a living.

The village has 10,000 yaks and 25,000 sheep.  However, a growing portion is now being employed in the textile industry.

References

Gannan Tibetan Autonomous Prefecture
Villages in China